Bicyclus analis, the anal-patch bush brown, is a butterfly in the family Nymphalidae. It is found in eastern Nigeria, Cameroon, the Democratic Republic of the Congo and western Uganda.

References

Elymniini
Butterflies described in 1895
Butterflies of Africa